The Women's 1500 metres in short track speed skating at the 2002 Winter Olympics took place on 13 February at the Salt Lake Ice Center.

Records
Prior to this competition, the existing world and Olympic records were as follows:

The following new Olympic and World records were set during this competition.

Results

Heats
The first round was held on 20 February. There were five heats, with the top three finishers moving on to the semifinals.

Heat 1

Heat 2

Heat 3

Heat 4

Heat 5

Semifinals
The semifinals were held on 13 February. The top two finishers in each of the three semifinals qualified for the A final, while the third and fourth place skaters advanced to the B Final.

Semifinal 1

Semifinal 2

Semifinal 3

Finals
The six qualifying skaters competed in Final A, while six others raced in Final B.

Final A

Final B

References

Women's short track speed skating at the 2002 Winter Olympics
Women's events at the 2002 Winter Olympics